Azman bin Nasrudin (born 11 April 1972) is a Malaysian politician who has served as the Member of Parliament (MP) for Padang Serai since December 2022, Member of the Kedah State Executive Council (EXCO) in the Perikatan Nasional (PN) state administration under Menteri Besar Muhammad Sanusi Md Nor since May 2020 and in the Pakatan Harapan (PH) state administration under former Menteri Besar Mukhriz Mahathir from 2018 to 2020 and Member of the Kedah State Legislative Assembly (MLA) for Lunas since May 2013. He is a member of the Malaysian United Indigenous Party (BERSATU), a component party of the PN coalition was a member of the People's Justice Party (PKR), a component party of the PH coalition.

Political career

2020 defection and collapse of the Kedah PH state administration
On 12 May 2020, Azman and Sidam MLA Robert Ling Kui Ee of PH defected from PKR and became independent MLAs in support of PN, leading to the resignation of Mukhriz Mahathir as Menteri Besar and collapse of the PH state administration led by Mukhriz as PH had lost the majority support in the assembly required to form the government after both of them withdrew support for PH who had only a slim majority in the assembly. Following that, PH returned to the opposition while PN and PN became the government with the appointment of Muhammad Sanusi Md Nor of PN as the new Menteri Besar on 17 May 2020. Sanusi then reappointed him as EXCO member.

Election results

Notes

References 

Living people
People from Kedah
Malaysian people of Malay descent
Malaysian Muslims
People's Justice Party (Malaysia) politicians
21st-century Malaysian politicians
Members of the Kedah State Legislative Assembly
Kedah state executive councillors
1972 births